Carl Spitzweg (February 5, 1808 – September 23, 1885) was a German romanticist painter, especially of genre subjects. He is considered to be one of the most important artists of the Biedermeier era.

Life and career
Spitzweg was born in Unterpfaffenhofen, near Munich, Bavaria, the second of three sons of Franziska (née Schmutzer) and Simon Spitzweg. His father, a wealthy merchant, had Carl trained as a pharmacist. He attained his qualification from the University of Munich but, while recovering from an illness, he took up painting.

Spitzweg was self-taught as an artist, starting out by copying the works of Flemish masters. He contributed his first work to satiric magazines. Upon receiving an inheritance in 1833, he was able to dedicate himself to painting.

Later, Spitzweg visited European art centers in Prague, Venice, Paris, London, and Belgium studying the works of various artists and refining his technique and style. His later paintings and drawings are often humorous genre works. Many of his paintings depict sharply characterized eccentrics, for example The Bookworm (1850) and The Hypochondriac (c. 1865, in the Neue Pinakothek, Munich).

His paintings inspired the musical comedy Das kleine Hofkonzert by Edmund Nick.

Playing Piano, an etching by Spitzweg, was found as part of the Munich Art Hoard.

Spitzweg is buried in the Alter Südfriedhof in Munich.

Forgeries
In the late 1930s an art forgery case in Germany involved 54 paintings which had been passed off as Spitzweg originals. They had been painted by a Traunstein copyist named Toni who worked from reproductions and picture postcards. Toni signed the works with his own name as "after Spitzweg", but fraudsters later removed his name and artificially aged the paintings in order to sell them as originals. At the Stuttgart Criminal Court Assizes the conspirators were jailed for up to ten years for the swindle.

Selected paintings

References

Sources
Murray, P. & L. (1996). Dictionary of Art and Artists. London: Penguin Books. .

External links 

 
 Biography and selected paintings of Carl Spitzweg
 The Spitzweg Game 
 Spitzweg Gallery at MuseumSyndicate 
 Milwaukee Art Museum has a large Spitzweg collection
German masters of the nineteenth century: paintings and drawings from the Federal Republic of Germany, a full text exhibition catalog from The Metropolitan Museum of Art, which contains material on Carl Spitzweg (no. 87–90)

1808 births
1885 deaths
19th-century German painters
19th-century German male artists
Burials at the Alter Südfriedhof
German male painters
German romantic painters
People educated at the Wilhelmsgymnasium (Munich)
Artists from Munich
People from the Kingdom of Bavaria
Orientalist painters
Biedermeier painters
People from Fürstenfeldbruck (district)